The Maplewood Historic District is located in Rochester in Monroe County, New York. The district is distinguished as having landscape designs, including Maplewood Park, originally laid out by Frederick Law Olmsted.

The district consists of 432 contributing structures and four contributing sites.  They include 245 contributing primary buildings (234 houses, two apartments, three churches, two church-related residences, three buildings associated with a church school, and one recreational facility).  There are also 187 contributing outbuildings (carriagehouses and garages). The four contributing sites are three parks and one archaeological site.

It was listed on the National Register of Historic Places in 1997. In 2016 its boundaries were increased to take in more properties.

See also

National Register of Historic Places listings in Rochester, New York

References

Historic districts in Rochester, New York
Second Empire architecture in New York (state)
Queen Anne architecture in New York (state)
Italianate architecture in New York (state)
Historic districts on the National Register of Historic Places in New York (state)
National Register of Historic Places in Rochester, New York